The Red Ball Express was a famed truck convoy system that supplied Allied forces moving quickly through Europe after breaking out from the D-Day beaches in Normandy in 1944. To expedite cargo shipment to the front, trucks emblazoned with red balls followed a similarly marked route that was closed to civilian traffic. The trucks also had priority on regular roads.

Conceived in an urgent 36-hour meeting, the convoy system began operating on August 25, 1944. Staffed primarily with African-American soldiers, the Express at its peak operated 5,958 vehicles that carried about 12,500 tons of supplies a day. It ran for 83 days until November 16, when the port facilities at Antwerp, Belgium, were opened, enough French rail lines were repaired, and portable gasoline pipelines were deployed.

History
Use of the term "Red Ball" to describe express cargo service dated at least to the end of the 19th century. Around 1892, the Santa Fe railroad began using it to refer to express shipping for priority freight and perishables. Such trains and the tracks cleared for their use were marked with red balls. The term grew in popularity and was extensively used by the 1920s.

The need for such a priority transport service during World War II arose in the European Theater following the successful Allied invasion at Normandy in June 1944. To hobble the German army's ability to move forces and bring up reinforcements in a counter-attack, the Allies had preemptively bombed the French railway system into ruins in the weeks leading up to the D-Day landing.

At the time of the landing, traditional French ports were mostly inoperable and, after supporting the troops of the Allied invasion, the Normandy beaches needed to then become the makeshift port that would supply the march toward Germany. The temporary piers and docks that would create the port had been brought from England and had, by the end of June, 170,000 vehicles,  of fuel and 500,000 tons of supplies. Some 28 Allied divisions needed constant resupply. During offensive operations, each division consumed about 750 tons of supplies per day (about 100 pounds per man) totaling about 21,000 tons in all. The only way to deliver them was by truck – thereby giving birth to the Red Ball Express.

At its peak, it operated 5,958 vehicles and carried about 12,500 tons of supplies per day. Colonel Loren Albert Ayers, known to his men as "Little Patton", was in charge of gathering two drivers for every truck, obtaining special equipment, and training port battalion personnel as drivers for long hauls. Able-bodied soldiers attached to other units whose duties were not critical were made drivers. Almost 75% of Red Ball drivers were black.

Over 36 hours of planning, 132 already existing military trucking operations were combined into a truck force composed primarily of 2.5 ton GMC “Jimmy’s” and 1.5 ton Dodges. The Dodge trucks had a reputation for reliability. The GMCs were prone to breakdown, but were available in greater numbers. The larger concept of the Express and its routing would be the work of General Dwight D. Eisenhower, based on a French model (and would be an influence in Eisenhower’s role in the development of the U.S. Interstate Highway System in the 1950s).

To keep supplies flowing without delay, two routes were opened from Cherbourg (Cherbourg-en-Cotentin since 2016) to the forward logistics base at Chartres. The northern route was used for delivering supplies, the southern for returning trucks. Both roads were closed to civilian traffic.

The Red Ball was at the center of a number of other named supply tracks. The Green Diamond operated in the region of Cherbourg; the White Ball from Le Havre to Paris; the Lions Express between Bayeux and Brussels; and the ABC Express eastward from Antwerp.

Only convoys of at least five trucks were allowed, escorted in front and behind by a jeep. In reality, it was common for individual trucks to depart Cherbourg as soon as they were loaded.

Convoys were a primary target of the German Luftwaffe but by 1944 German air power was so reduced that even these tempting and typically easy targets were rarely attacked. The biggest problems facing the Express were maintenance, finding enough drivers, and lack of sleep for the overworked truckers.

The most problematic natural enemy of the Express was mud. The trucks used  wheels that could be easily overwhelmed, and efforts to escape could burn out transmissions while dried mud could immobilize their brakes. 

To control traffic and provide security for the route, the 793rd Military Police Battalion, activated December 1942, was sent to the Red Ball from August through December 1944. The early beginnings of the battalion are commemorated on the distinctive unit insignia, with two red balls on a diagonal line of yellow, with a field of green behind (green and gold are the colors of the U.S. Army Military Police).

See also

 Military history of African Americans

References

Citations

General and cited references

External links

 Red Ball Express 

African-American history of the United States military
Military history of the United States during World War II
Military logistics of World War II
Military transport
United States Army in World War II
Western European Campaign (1944–1945)